Vincent Scully,  (8 January 1810 – 4 June 1871), was an Irish Liberal and Whig politician.

He was first elected as one of the two Members of Parliament (MPs) for Cork County at a by-election in 1852, and retained it in the general election later that year, but lost the seat at the following general election in 1857. He regained the seat in 1859 before losing it again in 1865. While an MP during the former years, Scully produced a number of pamphlets on the Irish land question, including Free Trade in Land (published 1853). He also introduced the 'Transfer of Land Bill (Ireland)' to the House of Commons in 1853, which was "praised for its ingenuity".

Scully was educated at Oscott College, where he was one of the editors of The Oscotian from 1826. He also attended Trinity College Dublin and Trinity College, Cambridge but did not graduate from either of the universities.

In 1833, he was called to the Irish Bar, and in 1840 he became a Queen's Counsel.

References

External links
 

1810 births
1871 deaths
Whig (British political party) MPs for Irish constituencies
UK MPs 1847–1852
UK MPs 1852–1857
UK MPs 1859–1865
Members of the Parliament of the United Kingdom for County Cork constituencies (1801–1922)
Irish barristers
Irish Liberal Party MPs
Irish Queen's Counsel
19th-century King's Counsel